Liu Lei (born February 1957) is a general of the Chinese People's Liberation Army (PLA). He has been Political Commissar of the PLA Ground Force since December 2015, and formerly served as Political Commissar of the Lanzhou Military Region and the Xinjiang Military District.

Biography
Liu Lei was born in February 1957 in Liaocheng, Shandong province. He joined the PLA in 1973 at age 16. In the 1990s, he graduated from the joint combat commander training program of the PLA National Defence University. He also studied at the graduate school of the Chinese Academy of Sciences and holds a doctoral degree.

Liu has served in the Lanzhou Military Region for more than 40 years, including many years in the 21st Group Army. In June 2003, he became Director of the Political Department of the Nanjiang (Southern Xinjiang) Military District. He attained the rank of major general in July 2004. In January 2007, he became Political Commissar of the 21st Army. He was appointed Political Commissar of the Xinjiang Military District, which is under the Lanzhou MR, in July 2013.

In November 2013, six days after a suicide attack on Beijing's Tiananmen Square, thought to be perpetrated by Uyghurs from Xinjiang, Commander Peng Yong of the Xinjiang MD was removed from the Regional Party Standing Committee, the Communist Party governing body in Xinjiang, and replaced by Liu Lei.

Liu attained the rank of lieutenant general (zhongjiang) in July 2014, and was promoted to Political Commissar of the Lanzhou Military Region in December 2014, replacing Miao Hua, who had been promoted to Political Commissar of the PLA Navy. Major General Li Wei succeeded Liu as Political Commissar of the Xinjiang MD.In December 2015,  he was made the inaugural Political Commissar of People's Liberation Army Ground Force. On July 28, 2017, Liu was promoted to the rank of general (shangjiang).

References 

1957 births
Living people
People's Liberation Army generals from Shandong
People from Liaocheng
PLA National Defence University alumni
Political commissars of the Lanzhou Military Region
Political commissars of the Xinjiang Military District
Delegates to the 11th National People's Congress
Delegates to the 12th National People's Congress
Members of the 19th Central Committee of the Chinese Communist Party